Giusto Manetti Battiloro is one of Florence's 25 oldest companies. Founded in Florence in 1820, the company produces and markets Gold leaf throughout the world.  Since 1950 the company also has operations in hot stamping foil.

The history of the company
The history of the Giusto Manetti Battiloro company began in 1820 when Luigi Manetti purchased the small artisan workshop of a Florentine goldbeater located in Via de’ Pescioni. After his death the company passed to his son, who lived between 1800 and 1900, and successfully overcame the difficult period of World War I.

A turning point for the company was around 1920 when, in just 12 years, a modern plant was built in Via Ponte alle Mosse (Florence), still the current headquarters of the company, and the workforce was increased to more than 200 employees and began to expand into foreign markets, in particular in Europe and North America.

The reconstruction
World War II led to a reduction of the company's activities caused by the call to arms of most of the male employees. On 2 July 1944 Florence was bombed by American aircraft, and the company's buildings were completely destroyed (the Americans likely mistook the factory for a railway freight depot). Despite this blow to the company, soon after the end of the war, in 1946, the Giusto Manetti Battiloro resumed gold leaf manufacturing, inaugurating the partial reconstruction of the plant.
In 1950 the company made their first agreement with an English goldbeater for the marketing and selling of hot stamping foils, thus originating the second branch of the company, which has since worked in tandem with the historical manufacturing of gold leaf.

The following years see the company involved in many great works of restoration, years in which the company supplied its gold leaf for some of the greatest monuments all around the world, including the Palace of Versailles, the halls of Windsor Castle, the dome of the Church of the holy sepulchre in Jerusalem and many more.

The flood and the growth of the company
New adversity struck the company in 1966 with the infamous Flood of the Arno River in Florence, when the ground floor of the plant was completed flooded, submerging most of the machinery. Once again the company was able to overcome this difficulty, and from then on the Giusto Manetti Battiloro has gone through a period of intense development, coinciding with the acquisition of a new branch office in Florence (where the hot stamping foil activity was transferred), and with the opening of two affiliated companies in Spain, in the city of Almeria, and in Poland, in the city of Częstochowa. Once more in these years Manetti Gold leaf has been used in several prestigious operations in Italy and all over the world: the restoration of the spires of the skyscraper of the New York Life Building in New York,  the great works of Tsarskoye Selo in Saint Petersburg, the reconstruction of the theatre La Fenice in Venice following the devastating fire of 29 January 1996, and the details of the Amerigo Vespucci (ship).

In the last few years Giusto Manetti Battiloro has been a leader in sponsoring major restorations in Florence, an initiative which culminated in the donation of the gold leaf necessary for the restoration of the massive ball which surmounts the Lantern of Florence's Cathedral, the Duomo.

References

External links

 

Italian brands
Italian jewellers
Fashion accessory brands
Luxury brands
High fashion brands
Manufacturing companies based in Florence
Privately held companies of Italy
Manufacturing companies established in 1820
Jewellery companies of Italy
1820 establishments in the Grand Duchy of Tuscany
1820 establishments in Italy